Mullett Arena (originally ASU Multi-Purpose Arena) is an indoor multipurpose arena at Arizona State University in Tempe, Arizona.

The 5,000-seat arena is the home of the men's ice hockey, women's ice hockey, women's gymnastics and men's wrestling teams. It also serves as a temporary venue for the National Hockey League's Arizona Coyotes from 2022 through at least 2025, with seating capacity for NHL games capped at 4,600. The facility is owned by Arizona State University and managed by the Oak View Group.

History

In November 2020, the Arizona Board of Regents' finance committee approved plans for a new 5,000-seat on-campus multipurpose arena, which replaced Oceanside Ice Arena as the Sun Devils men's hockey facility starting in 2022. It is also used for women's hockey, women's gymnastics, men's wrestling and community hockey events.

With their lease agreement at Gila River Arena expiring after the 2021–22 NHL season, the Arizona Coyotes were in talks by January 2022 with Arizona State University to temporarily use the ASU facility for the next 3 to 4 NHL seasons. On February 10, 2022, the Coyotes signed a three-year agreement to play their home games at Mullett Arena, beginning with the 2022–23 NHL season. The additional cost of completing the arena to accommodate the Coyotes was approximately $19.7 million, which was paid by the team. During the Coyotes' tenure in the building, it officially has the lowest permanent seating capacity in the NHL.

On August 23, 2022, Arizona State University unveiled the new facility name as Mullett Arena. It is in honor of Donald and Barbara Mullett, one of the university's benefactors.

On October 14, 2022, the Sun Devils men's hockey team played their first ever game at the arena against the Colgate Raiders. Josh Doan (son of Coyotes legend Shane Doan) scored the first ever goal in Mullett Arena history. The Sun Devils won the game, 2–0.

Two weeks later (October 28, 2022), the Coyotes' first ever game in front of a sellout crowd of 4,600 at Mullett Arena resulted in a 3–2 overtime loss to the Winnipeg Jets. Christian Fischer scored the first and second NHL goals at the arena.

Mountain America Community Iceplex at ASU

Arizona State University announced on March 3, 2022, a multiyear naming rights partnership with Mountain America Credit Union for the ice rink on the west side of Mullett Arena. Officially named as the Mountain America Community Iceplex at ASU, it has a concession stand for hot and cold refreshments and a full hockey pro shop.

For the first four Coyotes home games, temporary locker room accommodations were set up within the confines of Mountain America Community Iceplex for the visiting teams. The Winnipeg Jets, New York Rangers, Florida Panthers and Dallas Stars used this location during that opening Coyotes homestand.

After that, the Coyotes began a franchise record 14-game road trip while ongoing construction of the annex was officially completed in time for their next scheduled home game (December 9, 2022, against the Boston Bruins). This building will house all on-site NHL training and locker room facilities during the Coyotes' temporary stay at Mullett Arena.

References

External links

Mullett Arena

National Hockey League venues
Arizona State Sun Devils men's ice hockey
Arizona State Sun Devils women's ice hockey
Arizona State Sun Devils wrestling
Arizona State University buildings
College ice hockey venues in the United States
Indoor arenas in Arizona
Indoor ice hockey venues in the United States
Sports venues in Tempe, Arizona
College gymnastics venues in the United States
College wrestling venues in the United States
2022 establishments in Arizona
Sports venues completed in 2022
Arizona State Sun Devils
Arizona Coyotes